David T. Wong (born circa 1936 in Hong Kong) is a Hong Kong-born American neuroscientist. He is a former researcher with Eli Lilly and Company and an adjunct professor at the Indiana University School of Medicine. Wong is known for the discovery of the antidepressant drug fluoxetine, more commonly known by its trade name Prozac.

Wong was born in Hong Kong, and began his undergraduate studies in chemistry at National Taiwan University. He came to Seattle Pacific College in 1957, and graduated in 1961. He then went on to graduate studies at Oregon State University, where he earned a master's degree in 1964 and later at University of Oregon to receive his doctorate in 1966. After doing his postdoctoral research at the University of Pennsylvania, he joined Eli Lilly in 1968.

Compounds
While at Lilly, Wong became most interested in agents that bind to Biogenic Amine Transporters (BAT). These compounds primarily affect functioning of the CNS and have known uses in the treatment of depression, ADHD, libido, obesity and addiction. Although such agents can be made to increase serotonin and norepinephrine, an example of a compound with a demonstrated affinity for the DAT is called N-methylatmoxetine [83015-25-2]. He helped to study:

Fluoxetine
Atomoxetine
Duloxetine
Dapoxetine,
Nisoxetine
LY 125180 [74515-39-2]. 
6-CAT.
LY255582 [119193-09-8]
LY278584 (tropane analog of Granisetron)

Awards
Wong won the Pharmaceutical Manufacturers Association Discoverer's Award in 1993.
Wong was named Alumnus of the Year by Seattle Pacific University in 1998. 
He was given the Prince Mahidol Award in Medicine in 2011.

Notes

Living people
American academics of Chinese descent
American neuroscientists
Eli Lilly and Company people
Hong Kong emigrants to the United States
Indiana University School of Medicine faculty
Seattle Pacific University alumni
University of Oregon alumni
Year of birth uncertain
Year of birth missing (living people)